The 29 (BATUS) Flight Army Air Corps is an independent flight within the British Army's Army Air Corps that supports the British Army Training Unit Suffield (BATUS). 

BATUS conducts major training exercises in the Canadian province of Alberta, at the Canadian Forces Base Suffield. 29 Flight provides aviation support for the training. Its roles include supervision, CASEVAC (casualty evacuation), reconnaissance, liaison and limited lift of passengers and equipment.

The unit uses Westland Gazelle AH.1 helicopters.

5 Regiment AAC has administrative responsibility for 29 Flight.

See also

 List of Army Air Corps aircraft units

References

Army Air Corps independent flights